Saïd Chébili (born 6 May 1973) is a French former middle-distance runner who competed primarily in the 1500 metres. He represented his country at two outdoor and one indoor World Championships.

International competitions

Personal bests
Outdoor
800 metres – 1:49.29 (Aix-les-Bains 1999)
1000 metres – 2:20.76 (Nancy 1997)
1500 metres – 3:33.66 (St. Denis 1999)
One mile – 3:52.21 (Nice 1997)
2000 metres – 4:57.39 (Villeneuve d'Ascq 1997)
3000 metres – 7:57.71 (Villeneuve d'Ascq 1996)
Indoor
1500 metres – 3:37.76 (Stuttgart 2001)
One mile – 3:58.34 (Liévin 2000)
2000 metres – 5:00.88 (Budapest 1999)
3000 metres – 7:47.65 (Karlsruhe 2000)

References

All-Athletics profile

1973 births
Living people
French male middle-distance runners
World Athletics Championships athletes for France
People from Tizi Ouzou
Algerian emigrants to France
20th-century French people
21st-century French people